Freshly Squeezed is a British breakfast television programme which was broadcast every weekday morning on Channel 4 from August 2006 to December 2012.

Format
The programme took the format of a music-based breakfast show, featuring studio performances, music videos and interviews.

The show was cancelled at the end of 2012.

Presenters
As of the final episode, the presenters included:
Phil Clifton
Matt Edmondson
Jameela Jamil
Darren Jeffries
Matt Littler

The programme was hosted by two main presenters on a weekly rotational basis, though Hollyoaks duo Jeffries and Littler presented the programme together. Interviews were normally pre-recorded and were sometimes conducted by one of the other presenters.

Former
Former hosts of the programme include:
Alexa Chung
Rick Edwards
Nick Grimshaw
Zezi Ifore
George Lamb

Guest presenters
From time to time, a guest performer would join one of the regular hosts to present the programme for a week. Guest presenters included McFly, Kesha, Example and Chipmunk.

References

External links

2006 British television series debuts
2012 British television series endings
2000s British music television series
2010s British music television series
Channel 4 original programming
Breakfast television in the United Kingdom